This is a list of British Regular Army regiments after the Army restructuring caused by the 1957 Defence White Paper. The paper set out the reduction in size of the Army to 165,000 following the end of National Service and the change to an entirely voluntary army; units were to be disbanded or amalgamated over two phases, to be completed in 1959 and 1962.

Further cuts and amalgamations followed in the 1960s and early 1970s.

Cavalry

Household Cavalry
The Life Guards
Royal Horse Guards (The Blues)

Royal Armoured Corps

Heavy Cavalry
1st The Queen's Dragoon Guards
3rd Carabiniers (Prince of Wales's Dragoon Guards)
4th/7th Royal Dragoon Guards
5th Royal Inniskilling Dragoon Guards

Light cavalry
1st The Royal Dragoons
The Royal Scots Greys (2nd Dragoons)
The Queen's Own Hussars
The Queen's Royal Irish Hussars
9th/12th Royal Lancers (Prince of Wales's)
10th Royal Hussars (Prince of Wales's Own)
11th Hussars (Prince Albert's Own)
13th/18th Royal Hussars (Queen Mary's Own)
14th/20th King's Hussars
15th/19th The King's Royal Hussars
16th/5th The Queen's Royal Lancers
17th/21st Lancers

The Royal Tank Regiment
1st Royal Tank Regiment
2nd Royal Tank Regiment
3rd Royal Tank Regiment
4th Royal Tank Regiment
5th Royal Tank Regiment

Combat Arms
Royal Regiment of Artillery
Corps of Royal Engineers 
Royal Corps of Signals
Army Air Corps

Infantry
The infantry in 1962 was divided into 15 separate brigades for administrative purposes:
Guards Brigade: Grenadier Guards, Coldstream Guards, Scots Guards, Irish Guards, Welsh Guards.
Lowland Brigade: The Royal Scots, King's Own Scottish Borderers, Cameronians (Scottish Rifles) and Royal Highland Fusiliers.
Highland Brigade: The Black Watch, Gordon Highlanders, Argyll and Sutherland Highlanders and Queen's Own Highlanders.
Home Counties Brigade: The Royal Sussex Regiment, Middlesex Regiment, Queen's Royal Surrey Regiment and Queen's Own Buffs.
Fusilier Brigade: Royal Northumberland Fusiliers, Royal Fusiliers (City of London Regt) and Lancashire Fusiliers.
East Anglian Brigade: 1st, 2nd and 3rd East Anglian Regiments
Forester Brigade: Royal Warwickshire Regiment (until November 1962), Royal Leicestershire Regiment, Sherwood Foresters.
Mercian Brigade: Cheshire Regiment, Worcestershire Regiment, Staffordshire Regiment.
Welsh Brigade: Royal Welsh Fusiliers, South Wales Borderers, Welsh Regiment.
Wessex Brigade: Gloucestershire Regiment, Royal Hampshire Regiment, Devonshire and Dorset Regiment, Duke of Edinburgh's Royal Regiment.
Lancastrian Brigade: The Loyal Regiment (North Lancashire), King's Own Royal Border Regiment, King's Regiment and Lancashire Regiment (Prince of Wales's Volunteers).
Yorkshire Brigade: The Green Howards, Duke of Wellington's Regiment, Prince of Wales's Own Regiment of Yorkshire and York & Lancaster Regiment.
North Irish Brigade: Royal Inniskilling Fusiliers, Royal Irish Fusiliers, Royal Ulster Rifles.
Light Infantry Brigade: King's Own Yorkshire Light Infantry, King's Shropshire Light Infantry, Durham Light Infantry, Somerset and Cornwall Light Infantry.
Green Jackets Brigade: 1st Green Jackets (43rd and 52nd), 2nd Green Jackets (King's Royal Rifle Corps), 3rd Green Jackets (Rifle Brigade).

Foot Guards
Grenadier Guards
Coldstream Guards
Scots Guards
Irish Guards
Welsh Guards

Line Infantry and Rifles
The Royal Scots (The Royal Regiment)
The Queen's Royal Surrey Regiment
The Queen's Own Buffs, The Royal Kent Regiment
The King's Own Royal Border Regiment
The Royal Northumberland Fusiliers
The Royal Warwickshire Regiment
The Royal Fusiliers (City of London Regiment)
The King's Regiment (Manchester and Liverpool)
1st East Anglian Regiment (Royal Norfolk and Suffolk)
2nd East Anglian Regiment (Duchess of Gloucester's Own Lincoln and Northamptonshire)
The Devonshire and Dorset Regiment
The Somerset and Cornwall Light Infantry
The Prince of Wales's Own Regiment of Yorkshire
3rd East Anglian Regiment (16th/44th Foot)
The Royal Leicestershire Regiment
The Green Howards (Alexandra, Princess of Wales's Own Yorkshire Regiment)
The Lancashire Fusiliers
The Royal Highland Fusiliers (Princess Margaret's Own Glasgow and Ayrshire Regiment)
The Cheshire Regiment
The Royal Welch Fusiliers
The South Wales Borderers
The King's Own Scottish Borderers 
The Cameronians (Scottish Rifles)
The Royal Inniskilling Fusiliers
The Gloucestershire Regiment
The Worcestershire Regiment
The Lancashire Regiment (Prince of Wales's Volunteers)
The Duke of Wellington's Regiment (West Riding)
The Royal Sussex Regiment
The Royal Hampshire Regiment
The Staffordshire Regiment (The Prince of Wales's) 
The Welch Regiment
The Black Watch (Royal Highland Regiment)
1st Green Jackets (43rd and 52nd)
The Sherwood Foresters (Nottinghamshire and Derbyshire Regiment)
The Loyal Regiment (North Lancashire)
The Duke of Edinburgh's Royal Regiment (Berkshire and Wiltshire)
The King's Own Yorkshire Light Infantry
The King's Shropshire Light Infantry
The Middlesex Regiment (Duke of Cambridge's Own)
2nd Green Jackets, The King's Royal Rifle Corps
The York and Lancaster Regiment
The Durham Light Infantry
The Queen's Own Highlanders (Seaforth and Camerons) 
The Gordon Highlanders
The Royal Ulster Rifles
The Royal Irish Fusiliers (Princess Victoria's)
The Argyll and Sutherland Highlanders (Princess Louise's)
The Parachute Regiment
2nd King Edward VII's Own Gurkha Rifles (The Sirmoor Rifles) 
6th Queen Elizabeth's Own Gurkha Rifles
7th Duke of Edinburgh's Own Gurkha Rifles
10th Princess Mary's Own Gurkha Rifles
3rd Green Jackets, The Rifle Brigade
22nd Special Air Service Regiment
Royal Malta Artillery

Services    
Royal Army Chaplains' Department
Royal Army Service Corps
Royal Army Medical Corps
Royal Army Ordnance Corps
Corps of Royal Electrical and Mechanical Engineers
Corps of Royal Military Police
Royal Army Pay Corps
Royal Army Veterinary Corps
Small Arms School Corps
Military Provost Staff Corps
Royal Army Educational Corps
Royal Army Dental Corps
Royal Pioneer Corps
Intelligence Corps
Army Physical Training Corps
Army Catering Corps
General Service Corps
Queen Alexandra's Royal Army Nursing Corps 
Women's Royal Army Corps

Notes

References

The actual plan is found in TNA CAB 129/87/M(57)144 "The Future Organisation of the Army", 18 June 1957.

Regiments (1962)

20th-century history of the British Army